Carlos Alberto Monje Jr. is an American government official and senior advisor to Secretary Pete Buttigieg. He has served as the Under Secretary of Transportation for Policy within the Biden administration since July 2021.

Early life and education 

Monje is the first in his family born in the United States; his family is from Argentina. He graduated from Harvard University.

Career

Obama administration 

Monje served as deputy policy director at Obama for America and a special assistant in President Obama's DC Senate office where he handled homeland security and veterans affairs. He was helpful with the Senate confirmation of two cabinet secretaries as part of the Obama transition team's 2008 national security working group. Monje was chief of staff of the United States Domestic Policy Council and Special Assistant to the President during the Obama administration. He previously served as Acting Under Secretary and he was nominated by President Barack Obama in 2014 and 2015 to be the Assistant Secretary for Transportation Policy for the U.S. Department of Transportation, he was confirmed by the Senate on March 16, 2015, by a vote of 94–0. He then oversaw implementation of surface transportation programs, the discretionary grant programs, and efforts to promote equity and economic development.

Hillary Clinton presidential campaign 

Monje left the Obama administration to join the Hillary Clinton 2016 presidential campaign.

Twitter 

From March 2017 until September 2020, Monje was responsible for managing Twitter's public policy and government affairs in the U.S. and Canada. Monje left Twitter in September 2020 to join the transition team for Joe Biden.

Biden administration 
On April 22, 2021, President Joe Biden nominated him to be the Under Secretary of Transportation for Policy. On May 20, 2021, a hearing on his nomination was held before the Senate Commerce Committee. He was reported out favorably from the committee on June 16, 2021. On June 24, 2021, Monje was confirmed by the United States Senate via voice vote. 

He was sworn into office on July 7, 2021, by Secretary Pete Buttigieg.

Personal life 

Monje is a native of New Orleans. He met his wife, Anne Filipic, while they both worked on the Obama campaign in 2008.

References

External links

Living people
Year of birth missing (living people)
Biden administration personnel
Harvard University alumni
Louisiana Democrats
Obama administration personnel
People from New Orleans
Political campaign staff
Twitter, Inc. people
United States Department of Transportation officials